Bobby Beauchamp (born  1962) is an American former competitive figure skater. He is the 1979 World Junior silver medalist, 1983 Skate America bronze medalist, and 1983 U.S. national pewter medalist. He won the bronze medal at the 1987 World Professional Championships in Jaca, Spain.

Beauchamp was raised in Culver City, California. He began skating as a nine-year-old, as a form of physical therapy, having been born with a club foot affecting his left leg. He trained at the Culver City Ice Arena and the Santa Monica Ice Chalet, coached by Mabel Fairbanks and John Nicks.

After ending his competitive career, Beauchamp skated with the Ice Capades. As of 2017, he is a skating coach at Ice Station in Valencia, California.

Competitive highlights

References 

1960s births
African-American sportsmen
American male single skaters
Living people
Sportspeople from Los Angeles County, California
World Junior Figure Skating Championships medalists
21st-century African-American people
20th-century African-American sportspeople